Complex was a Japanese rock duo composed of guitarist Tomoyasu Hotei and singer Koji Kikkawa. They released their self-titled debut in 1989, along with their first single and video, "Be My Baby". After a tour to promote the album, they released its follow-up, Romantic 1990, followed by a live album, 19901108 a year later.

The concert immortalized on the 19901108 CD and video turned out to be their last. They broke up sometime after the show, and in an interview Hotei said that the experience of Complex ended his friendship with Kikkawa (equating it to a divorce) and that he thought the whole thing was "a mistake". To date, neither Hotei nor Kikkawa has elaborated on the reason behind the band's breakup.

Following the band's breakup, both Hotei and Kikkawa continued their solo careers.

The band's label Toshiba EMI released a greatest hits compilation called Complex Best in 1998, and a DVD re-issues of their video catalog, which are currently out of print.

On April 28, 2011, it was announced that after 21 years, Kikkawa and Hotei would reunite for a Complex show on July 30 and 31st at the Tokyo Dome. All proceeds were donated to aid the victims of the Tōhoku earthquake and tsunami. The performance was released on CD, DVD and Blu-ray in 2012.

Discography

Albums 
 Complex (April 26, 1989)

 Romantic 1990 (April 18, 1990)

 19901108 (January 23, 1991, live album)
 Complex Best (February 6, 1998, compilation album)

Singles 
 "Be My Baby" (April 8, 1989)

 "1990" (March 14, 1990)

Videos 
 Be My Baby
 Complex Tour '89
 Romantic
 Romantic Extra
 19901108

In popular culture 
 The band was referenced as a pun in episode 24 of the 2015 reboot of Osomatsu-kun.
 In 2016, the song "Be My Baby" went viral in Japan via an edit featuring Abe Nana and Sato Shin of the Cinderella Girls subseries of Bandai Namco Entertainment's popular Idolmaster franchise.

References 

Japanese rock music groups
Rock music duos
Musical groups established in 1988
Musical groups disestablished in 1990